The Three Horseshoes is a public house in Drybridge Street in the Overmonnow area of Monmouth, Wales. The pub has also been used as an Inn and also known as The Three Horse Shoes Inn. The building has been a Grade II Listed building since 15 August 1974. Appears of 19th century but of C17th origin. 2 storeys, roughcast as stone with a hooded doorway

History
The pub was originally set up by  Blacksmith William Philips in the 1880s. The forge that Philips set up was also in Drybridge Street and had been set up in 1859. The Three Horse shoes name coming from the business that Philips was picking up from passing trade where a horse had shed a shoe.

In 1923 Osbert Wheeler was the publican the Three Horse Shoes yard was occupied by a horse breaker called Victor Mackie.

Notes

History of Monmouthshire
Pubs in Monmouth
Grade II listed buildings in Monmouthshire
Grade II listed pubs in Wales